The water polo tournament at the 2013 Mediterranean Games in Mersin took place between 19 June and 26 June at the Mersin University, Çiftlikköy Campus Swimming Pool. Only the men's water polo tournament was held.

Men's tournament

Medal summary

Events

Participating nations
Following nations have applied to compete in men's tournament. At least six nations competing is the requirement for tournament to be held. None of the Asian and African nations have opted to compete.

Men

References

 

 
Sports at the 2013 Mediterranean Games
2013
Med